Nathalie... is a 2003 French drama film directed by Anne Fontaine, and starring Fanny Ardant, Emmanuelle Béart, and Gérard Depardieu. The screenplay concerns a woman who discovers that her husband is cheating on her.

Plot
Catherine, a gynaecologist in her forties, accidentally learns that her husband Bernard, a businessman, has cheated on her. She hires an upmarket prostitute, who works as a hairdresser, to seduce her husband and tell her the details of their meetings. She asks the girl to play a character for this and to be called Nathalie. Nathalie accepts and a very ambiguous relationship is created between the two women. Nathalie uses very crude words to describe her meetings with Bernard. Many times the contract between the two women is broken (because it goes too far or because Catherine is no longer sure of what she wants) but each time Catherine relaunches the relationship.

The two women get so close that when Nathalie finds herself homeless, Catherine finds her new accommodation, she also introduces Nathalie to her mother. The relationship is complicated when Nathalie, still playing her role, announces to Catherine that Bernard wants to live with her. Catherine asks for explanations from her husband who swears that he has no other woman in his life. Perplexed, Catherine leads Bernard into the bistro which is her meeting place with Nathalie. When Nathalie enters the establishment and sees the couple, she flees. Nathalie then confides in Catherine that she made everything up and that she never met Bernard. Catherine decides to "forgive and forget".

Cast
 Fanny Ardant as Catherine
 Gérard Depardieu as Bernard
 Emmanuelle Béart as Nathalie / Marlène
 Wladimir Yordanoff as François 
 Judith Magre as Catherine's mother

The role of Nathalie was initially to be played by Vanessa Paradis, but the actress had to decline the role because of pregnancy.

Reception
On Rotten Tomatoes the film has an approval rating of 71% based on reviews from 24 critics. On Metacritic, the film has a score of 69% based on reviews from 11 critics, indicating "generally favorable reviews".

Derek Elley of Variety wrote: "An intellectual-cum-sexual teaser whose twist is apparent far too early on." Kirk Honeycutt of The Hollywood Reporter called it "An unconvincing psychosexual drama that tries to reconfigure the classic romantic triangle but winds up looking like a preposterous pretzel."

Remake
Director Atom Egoyan remade the film in 2009 under the title Chloe. The film stars Julianne Moore, Liam Neeson, and Amanda Seyfried. Elizabeth Weizmann of the New York Daily News  contrasting the original with the remake says Egoyan "Having adapted a film—via Erin Cressida Wilson's screenplay—from an erotic French drama called Nathalie, Egoyan appears convinced that he's creating a suspenseful work of art, rather than a mildly kinky bit of arthouse exploitation." In his self-promotion, the director of the remake, Egoyan, described Chloe as more erotically charged than Nathalie...

Fontaine said that she was interested in Egoyan's take on it. Fontaine also said that she was not happy with Nathalie... because the two lead actresses of the film objected to her original intention for a lesbian relationship to develop between their characters.

References

External links
 
 
 

2003 films
2000s erotic drama films
2000s French-language films
Films directed by Anne Fontaine
Adultery in films
French erotic drama films
Films about prostitution in Paris
Films set in Paris
Films shot in Paris
Films scored by Michael Nyman
2003 drama films
2000s French films